The Man Who Ate the Phoenix is a collection of fantasy short stories by Anglo-Irish writer Lord Dunsany. The first edition was published in London by Jarrolds in December 1949.

The book collects 41 short pieces by Dunsany.

Contents
"The Man Who Ate the Phoenix"
"The Widow Flynn's Apple Tree"
"Where Everyone's Business is Known"
"The Rose By-pass"
"An Old Man's Tale"
"How the Tinker Came to Skavangur"
"The Opal Arrow-Head"
"The Sultan's Pet"
"The Descent of the Sultan of Khash"
"The Policeman's Prophecy"
"The Wind in the Wood"
"The Tiger's Skin"
"The Finding of Mr. Jupkens"
"The Awful Dream"
"Mrs. Mulger"
"The Choice"
"Rose Tibbets"
"Little Snow White Up to Date"
"The Return"
"The Mad Ghost"
"The Cause"
"The Cut"
"The Sleuthing of Lily Bostum"
"The Possibility of Life on the Third Planet"
"Old Emma"
"How Abdul Din Saved Justice"
"The First Watch-Dog"
"The Chess-Player, the Financier, and Another"
"The Honorary Member"
"The Experiment"
"Down among the Kingcups"
"The Gratitude of the Devil"
"The After-Dinner Speech"
"The Je-ne-sais-quoi"
"Poseidon"
"A Near Thing"
"Ardor Canis"
"A Lapse of Memory"
"Forty Years On"
"The Iron Door"
"The Great Scoop"

References

1949 short story collections
Fantasy short story collections
Short story collections by Edward Plunkett, 18th Baron of Dunsany
Jarrold Publishing books